A weir is a barrier across a river. It may also refer to:

Places

Canada
 Weir, Quebec, an unincorporated village in Montcalm, Quebec

India
 Weir, Rajasthan
 Weir Dam, Maharashtra

United Kingdom
 Weir, Lancashire
 Wyre, Orkney, Scotland, which used to be spelt "Weir" occasionally

United States
 Weir, Kansas
 Weir, Kentucky
 Weir, Mississippi
 Weir, Texas
Weir, West Virginia
 Weir Farm National Historic Site, Connecticut, USA
 Weir Hill, a park in Massachusetts
 James Weir House, Tennessee, USA
 Weirs Beach, New Hampshire
 The Weirs, an archaeological site in Weirs Beach, New Hampshire

People and fictional characters
 Weir (surname), a list of people and fictional characters
 Sukollawat Kanaros, Thai actor nicknamed "Weir"

Arts and entertainment
 Weirs (album), by Luke Vibert and Jeremy Simmonds
 Weir (song), Killing Heidi's debut single
 The Weir, a 1997 play by Conor McPherson

Other uses
 Fishing weir, a type of fish trap
 Viscount Weir, a title in the Peerage of the United Kingdom
 WEIR, an American radio station
 Weir Group, an engineering company headquartered in Glasgow, Scotland

See also
 Wier (disambiguation)
 Weyr (disambiguation)